Anthracotherium (from  , 'coal' and   'beast')  was a genus of extinct artiodactyl ungulate mammals, characterized by having 44 teeth, with five semi-crescentic cusps on the crowns of the upper molars. The genus ranged from the middle Eocene period until the early Miocene, having a distribution throughout Eurasia.  Material subjectively assigned to Anthracotherium from Pakistan suggests the last species died out soon after the start of the Miocene.

Description
The genus typifies the family Anthracotheriidae, if only because it is the most thoroughly studied.  In many respects, especially the anatomy of the lower jaw, Anthracotherium, as with the other members of the family, is allied to the hippopotamus, of which it is probably an ancestral form. Anthracotheres, together with hippos, are grouped with cetaceans in the clade Whippomorpha.

Etymology
The genus name stems from the fact that the holotype and other first specimens were originally obtained from the Tertiary-aged lignite-beds of Europe.

The European Anthracotherium magnum was approximately as large as a pygmy hippo (about 2 m long and weighing up to 250 kg), but there were several smaller species and the genus also occurs in Egypt, India and North America. Members of the genus Anthracotherium, as well as other members of the family Anthracotheriidae, are known colloquially as anthracotheres.

References 

Anthracotheres
Oligocene even-toed ungulates
Eocene even-toed ungulates
Eocene genus first appearances
Chattian genus extinctions
Eocene mammals of Asia
Eocene mammals of Europe
Oligocene mammals of Asia
Oligocene mammals of Europe
Taxa named by Georges Cuvier
Prehistoric even-toed ungulate genera